"Shouldn't Have to Be Like That" is a song by Norwegian new wave band Fra Lippo Lippi, released in 1986 as a double A-side single with "The Distance Between Us". Both songs are from their third album, Songs. The single charted in several countries across Europe, including their homeland of Norway where it was most successful, peaking at No. 4.

Background
The song was written by keyboardist Øyvind Kvalnes and Rune Kristoffersen. Kvalnes composed the basic piano melody, Kristoffersen added the lyrics and the vocal melody. Originally released on their 1985 album Songs, the song was re-worked with producer Dave Allen for the 1986 Virgin Records release of the album and released as a single.

Charts

Other versions
In 2005, "Shouldn't Have to Be Like That" was remixed and released by Molella under the title "Lost Love".

References

1985 songs
1986 singles
Fra Lippo Lippi (band) songs
Song recordings produced by David M. Allen
Virgin Records singles